Distinguish Anong language, whose Chinese name has been misread as "Ayi".

Ayi is a language spoken by approximately 400 people in the southeast of Sandaun Province, Papua-New Guinea.

References

Tama languages
Languages of Sandaun Province